Marciszów  is a village in Kamienna Góra County, Lower Silesian Voivodeship, in south-western Poland. It is the seat of the administrative district (gmina) called Gmina Marciszów.

History 
Marciszów (also known as Merzdorf in the Giant Mountains) formed part of the Duchy of Schweidnitz and in 1368 the duchy became part of the Lands of the Bohemian Crown within the Holy Roman Empire. 

In 1526, when the Habsburg dynasty succeeded as kings of Bohemia, Merzdorf became ruled in personal union with Austria, Holy Roman Empire. Since 1742, with the First Silesian War Austrian Bohemia lost the Schweidnitz duchy to the Electorate of Brandenburg (part of the Holy Roman Empire [dissolved in 1806] but in personal union with independent Prussia). With Prussia Merzdorf joined Germany in 1871. 

From 1944 to 1945 under Nazi rule in Germany, in the textile factory Kramsta-Methner, Jewish women from various countries, then held captive in the concentration camps (Terezin, Auschwitz, Gross-Rosen etc.) were used for forced labour. 

After World War II, Merzdorf became part of Poland in 1945, and was renamed as Marciszów.

References

Villages in Kamienna Góra County
Holocaust locations in Poland